Aql bi al-quwwah is the first stage of the intellect's hierarchy in Islamic philosophy. This kind of reason is also called the potential or material intellect. in philosophy thus kind of intellect also called as passive intellect.

Historical background
Aristotle, in his "On the Soul" believes that human intellect at first is just a receptive faculty. This receptive capacity becomes actual by receiving the forms of things. It seems that Farabi for the first time in his book Treatise on Reason ( Risala fi'l-aql) renders the hierarchy of intellect following his theory on intellection. There Farabi tried to distinguish six meanings of Aql. The fifth intellect among them is very important. Farabi took notice to elaborate this kind of Aql in correct. Fifth reason itself divided to four stages, wherepotential Aql is the first stage. Other stages include actual intellect, acquired intellect and finally active intellect.

concept
Aql bi-al-quwwah defined reason as that which could abstract the forms of entities with which it is finally identified. for Farabi, the potential intellect could become actual by receiving the form in matter. In other words, Aql Hayulany tried to separate the forms of existence from their matters in such a way that there is no material characters along with forms such as material circumstances. The forms receive by potential Aql untied with it, in other words they become identical. Farabi also known the potential intellect as part of soul. according to Farabi, Aql Bil Quwwah  is ready to abstract the quiddities and forms from things and matters. after that, this kind of intellect transforms that forms for itself.

function in epistemology
according to Avicenna's intellectual abstraction, the potential Aql act as possible intellect. this stage begins with absolute potency. Avicenna, following Farabi, counted for reason some degrees like the potential one. at the same time Avicenna claimed that the intellect of human beings becomes perfect due to a transcendent link with eternally intellection. Avicenna believes that the legislator who has potential intellect receives the intelligible forms from agent intellect in political philosophy. Averroes also believed that the potential intellect essentially belong to the immaterial scope like active intellect. also he maintained the potential Aql accidentally is belong to material faculties. Averroes also take a step further since that he believed that all human beings have only one potential intellect. the content of intellectual understanding can be found in the perceptual experience by subject such that the truth of intelligible is casually grounded in all things through imagined forms.

See also
Islamic philosophy
Avicenna
Farabi
Passive intellect

References

Sources
 
 
 
 
 
 

Avicenna